The following are the Pulitzer Prizes for 1940.

Journalism awards

Public Service:
 Waterbury Republican-American for its campaign exposing municipal graft.
 Honorable mention to the San Francisco Chronicle for "its part in settling the water front and warehouse strike in San Francisco, June 22 to Dec. 1, 1939".
Reporting:
 S. Burton Heath of the New York World-Telegram for his expose of the frauds perpetrated by Federal judge Martin T. Manton, who resigned and was tried and imprisoned.
Correspondence:
 Otto D. Tolischus of The New York Times for his dispatches from Berlin.
 Honorable mention to Lloyd Lehrbas of the Associated Press for his dispatches from Warsaw, Bucharest, and Ankara.
Editorial Writing:
 Bart Howard of the St. Louis Post-Dispatch for his distinguished editorial writing during the year.

Editorial Cartooning:
 Edmund Duffy of The Baltimore Sun for "The 'Outstretched Hand'".

Letters and Novel Awards

Novel:
 The Grapes of Wrath by John Steinbeck (Viking).
Drama:
 The Time of Your Life by William Saroyan (Harcourt).
History:
 Abraham Lincoln: The War Years by Carl Sandburg (Harcourt).
Biography or Autobiography:
 Woodrow Wilson, Life and Letters. Vols. VII and VIII by Ray Stannard Baker (Doubleday).
Poetry:
 Collected Poems by Mark Van Doren (Holt).

References

External links
Pulitzer Prizes for 1940

Pulitzer Prizes by year
Pulitzer Prize
Pulitzer Prize